Hardie is a surname. Notable people with the surname include:

 Albert Hardie, Jr., American professional wrestler
 Andrew Hardie, Baron Hardie, British lawyer and politician
 Andrew Hardie (radical)
 Brad Hardie, Australian rules footballer
 Grant Hardie (born 1992), Scottish curler
 James Allen Hardie, (1823-76), American soldier
 John Hardie (rugby union), New Zealand rugby player
 John Hardie (footballer), Scottish footballer
 Keir Hardie, British politician
 Martin Hardie, Scottish footballer
 Michael Hardie Boys, New Zealand judge and Governor-General
 Neil Hardie, English curler
 Philip Hardie, professor of Latin literature
 R. A. Hardie, Canadian physician and missionary to Korea

See also 
 James Hardie, multinational company founded in Australia
 Hardy (surname)
 Hardee (surname)

Surnames of Scottish origin